This article presents a list of the historical events and publications of Australian literature during 1918.

Events 

 18 January – The first edition of Aussie: The Australian Soldiers' Magazine appears.

Books 

 J. H. M. Abbott — Sally : The Tale of a Currency Lass
 Mary Grant Bruce — Dick
 May Gibbs
 Snugglepot and Cuddlepie: Their Adventures Wonderful
 Wattle Babies
 G. B. Lancaster —  The Savignys
 Norman Lindsay — The Magic Pudding
 Steele Rudd — Memoirs of Corporal Keeley
 Lindsay Russell — Earthware 
 Ethel Turner — St. Tom and the Dragon

Poetry 

 Christopher Brennan — A Chant of Doom and Other Verses
 Zora Cross
 The City of Riddle-Me-Ree
 The Lilt of Life
 C. J. Dennis — Digger Smith
 Mary Gilmore
 The Passionate Heart
 Henry Lawson — Selected Poems of Henry Lawson
 Grace Ethel Martyr — Afterwards and Other Verses
 Myra Morris — England and Other Verses
 Walter Murdoch — The Oxford Book of Australasian Verse
 A. B. Paterson
 "Moving On"
 "Swinging the Lead"
 David McKee Wright — An Irish Heart

Births 

A list, ordered by date of birth (and, if the date is either unspecified or repeated, ordered alphabetically by surname) of births in 1918 of Australian literary figures, authors of written works or literature-related individuals follows, including year of death.

 26 January — Amy Witting, novelist (died 2001)
 10 July — James Aldridge, novelist (died 2015)
 16 September — Nan Hunt, Australian children's writer who also wrote as N. L. Ray (died 2015)

Deaths 

A list, ordered by date of death (and, if the date is either unspecified or repeated, ordered alphabetically by surname) of deaths in 1918 of Australian literary figures, authors of written works or literature-related individuals follows, including year of birth.

 28 April — Albert Robert Blackmore, poet (born 1886)
 12 October — Mary Hannay Foott, poet (born 1846)
 16 December — E. W. Cole, bookseller and publisher (born 1832)

See also 
 1918 in literature
1918 in poetry
 List of years in literature

References

Literature
Australian literature by year
20th-century Australian literature